Safi Belghomari (born 3 February 1979 in Béni Saf) is an Algerian professional footballer. He currently plays as a forward for the Algerian Ligue 2 club USM Annaba.

References

External links
 
 

1979 births
Algerian footballers
Algerian Ligue Professionnelle 1 players
Algerian Ligue 2 players
CS Constantine players
Living people
MC Alger players
MC Oran players
People from Béni Saf
US Biskra players
USM Annaba players
USM Bel Abbès players
Association football forwards
21st-century Algerian people